The West Sutton Historic District encompasses the rural southwestern section of Sutton, Massachusetts, including the rural village of West Sutton, which stretches along Central Turnpike from Manchaug Road to the Oxford town line.  Most of its  are taken up by farmsteads and the associated agricultural lands.  The village, which consists primarily of residential properties from the 18th and 19th centuries, also includes a church, cemetery, former tavern, former school, and evidence of an early industrial past, including one extant sawmill which dates to 1831.

The district was listed on the National Register of Historic Places in 2001.

See also
National Register of Historic Places listings in Worcester County, Massachusetts

References

Historic districts in Worcester County, Massachusetts
National Register of Historic Places in Worcester County, Massachusetts
Historic districts on the National Register of Historic Places in Massachusetts
Sutton, Massachusetts